Bertie Sue Dueitt is a retired American military officer. A Leakesville, Mississippi native, she moved to the Washington, D.C. area in 1977 to begin a job at the United States Department of Health, Education, and Welfare; later that year, she joined the United States Army Reserve. In June 1997, she became the first woman in the Army Reserve outside of the Nurse Corps to be promoted to brigadier general.

Early life and education
Dueitt was born in Leakesville, Mississippi and grew up in nearby McLain. She graduated from McLain High School in 1964, after which she attended the University of Southern Mississippi, graduating from the latter institution in three years.

She received a PhD in administration from the University of Alabama and performed other graduate work at American University and the United States Army War College.

Career
Dueitt moved to the Washington, D.C. area in 1977 to work for the United States Department of Health, Education, and Welfare. Soon after, at a dinner, staff members of U.S. Senate Armed Services Committee chair John C. Stennis convinced her to commission as a reserve military officer. By 1997, Dueitt was a colonel in the Army's Adjutant General's Corps and deputy chief of public affairs at Army headquarters in The Pentagon. In June of that year, she was promoted to brigadier general, becoming the first female general officer in the Army Reserve not from the Nurse Corps.

Dueitt retired from the Army in 2005 and works as a consultant.

References

See also
Dorothy Pocklington, first woman to be promoted to brigadier general in the Army Reserve

Living people
American University alumni
Female generals of the United States Army
University of Alabama alumni
University of Southern Mississippi alumni
Year of birth missing (living people)